Ischalis is a genus of moths in the family Geometridae. The genus was erected by Francis Walker in 1863. All species within this genus are endemic to New Zealand.

Species
Species contained in this genus are as follows:
Ischalis dugdalei Weintraub & Scoble, 2004
Ischalis fortinata (Guenée, 1868)
Ischalis gallaria (Walker, 1860)
Ischalis nelsonaria (Felder & Rogenhofer, 1875)
Ischalis variabilis (Warren, 1895)

References

Lithinini
Endemic fauna of New Zealand
Taxa named by Francis Walker (entomologist)
Endemic moths of New Zealand